Sara FM, is a radio broadcasting station that broadcasts via FM band 97.0 MHz frequency in Northern Cyprus.

Radio Hosts
Burç Tunçer (Weekdays: 10:00-12:00) (Cyprus Time)
Mehmet Ali Ayanoğlu (Weekdays: 12:00-14:00 & 17:00-19:00) (Cyprus Time)

References

External links
Official Website

Radio stations in Cyprus
Radio stations established in 2014